''For other places called Ambatoharanana, please see: Ambatoharanana (disambiguation)

Ambatoharanana I is a rural municipality in Madagascar. It belongs to the district of Vavatenina, which is a part of Analanjirofo Region. The population of the commune was estimated to be approximately 15,000 in the 2001 commune census.

Only primary schooling is available. The majority 90% of the population of the commune are farmers, while an additional 6% receive their livelihood from raising livestock. The most important crops are rice and cloves; coffee is also an important agricultural product. Services provide employment for 4% of the population.

References and notes 

Populated places in Analanjirofo